Perrine is both used as a female given name and as a surname. The name is derived from the French word pierre, stone. Notable people with the name include:

Surname
 Perrine (music theorist) (died after 1698), French music theorist and lute teacher
 Bull Perrine (1877–1915), American baseball umpire 
 Charles Dillon Perrine (1867–1951), American-Argentine astronomer
 Henry Perrine (1797–1840), American physician, horticulturist, United States Consul in Campeche, Mexico
 I. B. Perrine (1861–1943), American farmer, rancher and businessman
 Laurence Perrine, American scholar of English-language literature
 Melissa Perrine (born 1988), Australian visually impaired para-alpine skier
 Nig Perrine (1885–1948), American baseball infielder
 Valerie Perrine (born 1943), American actress
 Van Dearing Perrine (1869–1955), American Impressionist painter

Given name
 Perrine Delacour (born 1994), French golfer
 Perrine Goulet (born 1978), French politician
 Perrine Laffont (born 1998), French mogul skier
 Perrine Leblanc (born 1980), Canadian writer
 Pérrine Moncrieff (1893–1979), New Zealand author, conservationist and amateur ornithologist
 Perrine Pelen (born 1960), French alpine ski racer

Fictional characters
 Perrine H. Clostermann, a character from the media franchise Strike Witches

See also
 Perine, a surname

French feminine given names